Heather Jean Matthews  (formerly Thomson; born 1946) is a New Zealand middle-distance runner.

She competed at the 1978 Commonwealth Games, winning a silver medal in the women's 3000 m.

In the 1980s, she turned to international road relays, and more recently has managed New Zealand road relay teams. She was appointed a Member of the Order of the British Empire, for services to athletics, in the 1988 New Year Honours.

She is featured in the New Zealand short film On the Run training adjacent to the Auckland Airport.

References 

 Athletes at the Games by John Clark, page 140 (1998, Athletics New Zealand)

External links 
 Heather Matthews - Art tutor, article by Terry Moore

New Zealand female middle-distance runners
Athletes (track and field) at the 1978 Commonwealth Games
Commonwealth Games silver medallists for New Zealand
Commonwealth Games medallists in athletics
1946 births
Living people
Medallists at the 1978 Commonwealth Games